Emalamo Airport is an airport in Sanana, Sula Islands Regency, North Maluku. It has a runway measuring 1,100 x 23 m (3,609 x 75 ft).

Airlines and destinations

References 

Airports in North Maluku